Rigger may refer to:

 One who attends to the rigging of a sailing ship
 Rigger (entertainment), those who tend rigging in stage performance (theater, film, concert, etc.)
 Rigger (industry), specializing in moving large/heavy objects such as logs
 Parachute rigger
 Bondage rigger, one who ties up others primarily as an art form
 One who sets up a racing shell in the sport of rowing
 Rigger, Duke Nukem's henchman from the animated series Captain Planet and the Planeteers

See also 
 
 
 Outrigger, often used in rowing or canoeing
 Rig (disambiguation)